No Man's Gold is a 1926 American silent Western film directed by Lewis Seiler and written by John Stone. The film stars Tom Mix, Eva Novak, Frank Campeau, Mickey Moore, Malcolm Waite, and Forrest Taylor. The film was released on August 29, 1926, by Fox Film Corporation.

Cast
 Tom Mix as Tom Stone
 Eva Novak as Jane Rogers
 Frank Campeau as Frank Healy
 Mickey Moore as Jimmy Rogers 
 Malcolm Waite as Pete Krell
 Forrest Taylor as Wat Lyman
 Harry Gripp as Lefty Logan

References

External links

 
 

1926 films
Fox Film films
1926 Western (genre) films
Films directed by Lewis Seiler
American black-and-white films
Silent American Western (genre) films
1920s English-language films
1920s American films